Jon Audun Baar (1986 in Tomter, Hobøl, Norway) is a Norwegian Jazz drummer.

Career 
Baar studied jazz drumming at the Norwegian Academy of Music with teachers like Jon Christensen and Rune Martinsen. He has played on several jazzfestivals in Norway such as Moldejazz, Oslo Jazzfestival and Dølajazz with many different bands and artist. He plays within the critically acclaimed trio Eberson/Baar/Eberson with the international jazz guitar legend Jon Eberson and his daughter the keyboardist Marte Maaland Eberson.

Baar is the drummer of the bands Axel Jensen Lucky Three, Ambush, Malmfrid Hallum Band, Pedersen/Myhr/Baar Trio and Pixel including the front figure double bassist and vocalist Ellen Andrea Wang, trumpeter Jonas Kilmork Vemøy and saxophonist Harald Lassen, noted as "one of the most memorable moments" of the Match and Fuse Festival, by the Jazz magazine Down Beat.

Honors 
2013: Featured at Young Nordic Jazz Comets within Pixel

Discography 

Within Pixel
 2012: Reminder (Cuneiform)
 2013: We Are All Small Pixels (Cuneiform)
 2015: Golden Years (Cuneiform)

References

External links 
Pixel website
Pixel, Oslo, Norway Biography at Match and Fuse Festival in London

21st-century Norwegian drummers
Norwegian jazz drummers
Male drummers
Norwegian jazz composers
1986 births
Living people
People from Hobøl
Musicians from Østfold
Male jazz composers
21st-century Norwegian male musicians
Pixel (band) members